The University of Michigan Matthaei Botanical Gardens (300 acres, 121 hectares) includes botanical gardens, natural areas with trails, and several research-quality habitats and is part of the organization Matthaei Botanical Gardens and Nichols Arboretum. The conservatory is popular year round. The public entrance is at 1800 North Dixboro Road in Ann Arbor, Michigan. The grounds are open every day, but trails are not maintained in the winter. The conservatory, garden store, and lobby are open 7 days a week: Mon., Tues., and Thurs. - Sun., 10:00 am–4:30 pm; Wednesdays 10 am-8 pm. The building complex is only closed on three holidays a year. The institution's main web site with updated information is Matthaei Botanical Gardens and Nichols Arboretum.

The botanical gardens includes outdoor display gardens, the Gaffield Children's Garden, a 10,000+ square-foot conservatory, and natural areas with walking trails. The gardens are named after former Michigan regent Frederick C. Matthaei Sr. and his wife Mildred, who donated  of land.

Matthaei Botanical Gardens offers activities and resources for all visitors, from families to gardening enthusiasts to hikers, birders, scientists, volunteers, and to University of Michigan faculty, staff, and students. The gardens is dedicated to environmental stewardship and to enriching the understanding and enjoyment of the natural world through research, creative works, public outreach, and educational programs and workshops for adults and children.

Mission 
Matthaei Botanical Gardens and Nichols Arboretum shared their new strategic plan on September 1, 2022.  This plan included a new Mission Statement:

Matthaei Botanical Gardens and Nichols Arboretum is a transformative force for social and ecological resilience through the waters and lands we steward. We turn this commitment into action by:
Positioning humans as active participants within the natural world and compelling the university community and our publics to negotiate the full complexity that entails
Advancing partnerships, programs, user experience, and all that we steward to catalyze equity and justice in a radically changing world
Emerging as University of Michigan’s premier partner for research, teaching, and public impact in sustainability, climate-forward practices, and biocultural diversity
Promoting healthier communities, cultures, and ecosystems through active care and cultivation of the gardens, fields, natural habitats, and dynamic systems that sustain our world

Gardens and hardy collections 
The gardens and hardy collections consist of several formal displays and outdoor plantings:
Alexandra Hicks Herb Knot Garden - modern version of a Tudor period garden, with hedges of the yew (Taxus x media 'hicksii') and boxwood (Buxus sempervirens ‘Green Gem’), as well as lavender (Lavandula angustifolia ‘Hidcote’), creeping thyme (Thymus serpyllum), and winter savory (Satureja montana). The Herb Knot Garden honors "Sandy" Hicks (1934-1991) for her interest in herb and culinary gardening and healing plants and for her enthusiasm in sharing these interests with others.
Demonstration Prairie - a restored prairie, restoration beginning in 1967, on previously agricultural land.
Gaffield Children's Garden - a place for exploration and fun in a natural setting specially designed from a child's perspective. The garden features several play areas and interactive stations.
Gateway Garden of New World Plants - ornamental plants native to the Americas, including coreopsis, cosmos, marigolds, ornamental peppers, petunias, phlox, sunflowers, tropical salvias, and verbenas.
Helen V. Smith Woodland Wildflower Garden - more than 100 native species of wildflowers, woody plants, and ferns of the southern Great Lakes Region.
Labyrinth - located in a quiet setting, the labyrinth provides the opportunity for walking meditation, contemplation, and tranquility
Marie Azary Rock Garden - a rock garden.
Matteson Farmstead and Historic Barns - the Matteson farmhouse dates to the 1860s. The smaller barn was built circa 1845-1865, while the larger, gambrel-roofed barn is circa 1875-1900. The farmstead and barns are currently closed to the public (August 2011). 
Norman Memorial Garden - The Norman Memorial Grove is a popular gathering place near the west entrance to the Sue Reichert Discovery Trail. The Grove has been expanded with new plantings of native oak, maple, hickory, and sassafras.
Perennial Garden - Spring and summer bloom and a popular wedding spot.
Sam Graham Trees - A special collection of major trees native to the state of Michigan.
Transitions - entryway to trails and wetlands.
Urban Pocket Garden - European hornbeam (Carpinus betulus), eastern white pines (Pinus strobus), and Kentucky coffeetree (Gymnocladus dioicus).

Conservatory 
The 10,000+ square-foot conservatory was designed by architect Alden Dow, and completed in 1964. It is believed to be the largest university-operated display greenhouse in the United States. The conservatory contains three distinct areas:

Tropical house - Collections include Ananas comosus, Annona muricata, bromeliads, Caryota mitis, Cocos nucifera, Coffea arabica, cycads (including a Dioon spinulosum given by Smith College in the 1920s), Heliconia vellerigera, Kigelia pinnata, Musa, orchids, Oryza sativa, Piper nigrum, Rhizophora mangle, and Theobroma cacao.
Temperate house - representing the Mediterranean region and warm-temperate Asia. Collections include bonsai displays (more than 40 specimens) and an Oriental camellia display, as well as Camellia sinensis, Ceratonia siliqua, Cyperus papyrus, Ficus carica, Gossypium arboreum, Laurus nobilis, Olea europaea, Phoenix dactylifera, Phyllostachys nigra, and Quercus suber.
Arid house - representing hot deserts of the world. Collections include cactus, succulents, euphorbia, and lithops, as well as Agave americana, Aloe marlothii, Bowiea volubilis, Cyphostemma juttae, and Euphorbia milii.
Bonsai Collection - three bonsai trees or plants are always on display in the temperate house of the conservatory. There is also a bonsai display garden located outside of the conservatory where more of the bonsai collection is displayed for the public. To see more, go to http://bonsai.mbgna.umich.edu/welcome.htm

Natural areas and trails 
The natural areas include mature woodlands, wetlands, several ponds, and a constructed tall-grass prairie, with four nature trails covering 3.2 miles.

Dix Pond Trail - Nature reclaims old pastures, planted woodlots, and long-abandoned gravel pits.
Fleming Creek Trail - Abundant habitat diversity along with smaller wildlife that can be seen and sometimes heard along the way.
Marilyn Bland Prairie - a rich span of wildlife lives in the prairie, old fields, oak openings, and wetlands that are close to the historic Matteson farm and barns.
Sam Graham Trees Trail - Find Michigan's important trees arrayed in wetland to upland woods and into savanna habitats along this trail.
Sue Reichert Discovery Trail - Child-oriented signs and many activities make this a trail for kids of all ages. Discover animal tracks or explore a willow lodge.

Gallery

See also 
 Harley Harris Bartlett
 Frjeda Blanchard
 Nichols Arboretum
 List of botanical gardens in the United States
 Tourism in metropolitan Detroit

External links 

Video featuring Matthaei Botanical Gardens
Matthaei Botanical Gardens & Nichols Arboretum

University of Michigan campus
Botanical gardens in Michigan
Arboreta in Michigan
Protected areas of Washtenaw County, Michigan
Tourist attractions in Ann Arbor, Michigan
Greenhouses in Michigan